9 d'Octubre (English: October 9) is a celebration in the Valencian Community. It commemorates the conquest of the city of Balansiyya  by the troops of James I of Aragon and the creation of the Kingdom of Valencia in 1238.

Background

The celebration was created by James II of Aragon in the XIV century, mainly inside of the city of Valencia. Due its antiguity and popular tradition, the date was considered as the  Valencian National Day by the Board of Sindical and Political Forces of the Land of Valencia in 1976, and by the Plenary of Members of Parliament of Valencia in 1977. Finally, with the creation of the Valencian Community in 1982, it was made a Public holiday as the Valencian Community Day and is celebrated in the entire Valencian Community.

It consists on many activities, being the most representative the Civic procession held in Valencia since 1338, when it was instituted by Peter IV of Aragon to celebrate the centenary of the Kingdom of Valencia, and to demand protection to Saint Denis in the middle of a famine caused by poor rains. October 9 is also the Lover's Day in the Valencian Community, and it's a tradition to give frutta martorana as a present to a beloved person. This tradition is known as Mocadorà, being Mocador the Valencian word for handkerchief, where the marzipan fruits are held.

References

History of the Valencian Community
Valencia
National days
October observances
Public holidays in Spain
Autumn events in Spain